Harjeet Singh "Baba" Sehgal, is an Indian rapper. He was widely acclaimed to be the first Indian rapper. He is also involved in various other areas of the entertainment industry, and works in several different languages' media. He was a contestant in the reality show Bigg Boss in 2006.

Life and career

Early career
Born and raised in Lucknow, Baba Sehgal graduated with a B.Tech from G. B. Pant University of Agriculture and Technology, Pantnagar, Nainital. His entertainment career began in the 1990s, when he emerged as part of the Indipop scene, and released an album which got frequent airplay on MTV India. Since then he has been a popular figure on the rap scene, with hits such as 'Thanda Thanda Paani' (which sampled Vanilla Ice's "Ice Ice Baby", which in turn sampled Queen's "Under Pressure") 'Manjula' and 'Dil Dhadke'.

Music
Sehgal's first album was Dilruba (1990), followed by Alibaba (1991). Then came his biggest hit album Thanda Thanda Pani (1992), which sold 5million cassettes, making it the first successful Indian rap album.

His next albums were Main Bhi Madonna (1993), Baba Bachao na (1993), Dr.Dhingra (1994), Miss 420 (1994) movie soundtrack, Double Gadbad (1994) movie soundtrack, Indian Romyo (1995), Tora Tora (1995), Loomba Loomba (1996), na aariya hai na jaroya hai (1997), America mein indian dhaba (1997), d.j. mix blue (1997), dhak dhak dil in culcutta (1997), A Reason to Smile (1997), meri jaan hindustan (1998), jugni mast kalandar (1998), abb mein vengaboy (1999), pinga pinga (2001), Pump up your Style (2003), Welcome to Mumbai (2005), Babe di gaddi (2009), Woh beete din and The Magic of Dandiya, among others. He writes the majority of the music for his albums himself. He was the music director of the movie Dance Party (1995), featuring the popular song "kapurthala se aaya hoon, tere liye laaya hoon, Orange kurta peela pajama..". He was the first Indian artist to have a music video broadcast on MTV Asia, which was broadcasting out of Hong Kong at the time. He was also the presenter of the TV show Superhit Muqabla which was aired on DD2 at primetime. He has also worked as a stage performer.

He was in New York from 2001 to 2005. When he came home to Mumbai, he released his album Welcome to Mumbai, which was his 22nd album.

He also directed the music for the Bollywood film Bhoot Unkle (2006) and Nalaik (2005). He also anchored the TV show 'Santa and Banta news unlimited' on Zoom. His Song Trump Ka Mania  supporting the then Republican nominee Donald Trump was a hit.
Now, he makes and releases his singles on his YouTube channel "Baba Sehgal Entertainment". Some of them are Aloo ka Parantha, Going to the Gym, Swacchh Bharat. His song "Mumbai City" is a dark hip hop rap song on Mumbai.

Acting
In 1998, Sehgal made his acting debut in the Bollywood film Miss 420 alongside Sheeba Akashdeep . He also sang four songs for the film's soundtrack which was released in 1994, four years before the film's theatrical release. In 1999, he played dual roles in the television film Double Gadbad. He also composed and sang all the songs for the film's soundtrack.. In 2009, he had a part in the SAB TV comedy series Jugni Chali Jalandhar. In 2011, he appeared in the drama serial Rang Badalti Odhani on Star One. Sehgal also made his Telugu film debut in Rudhramadevi, with Anushka Shetty in the lead. It was directed by National award winner Gunasekhar. Baba Sehgal was signed to play a major negative role in another Telugu film titled Overdose. In 2016, he played a cameo as himself in Bank Chor. In the same year, he made his debut in Tamil cinema playing the role of a corrupt cop in Achcham Yenbadhu Madamaiyada.

He was a contestant on the first season of Bigg Boss 1 in 2006.

Filmography

As actor 

 Helicopter Eela (2018)
 Bank Chor (2017)
 Achcham Enbadhu Madamaiyada (2016)
Sahasam Swasaga Sagipo (2016)
 Rudramadevi (2015)
 My Friend Ganesha 3 (2010)
 Double Gadbad (1999) 
 Miss 420 (1998) Vicky

As playback singer

Telugu  

 Rikshavodu (1995) - "Roop Tera Mastana"
 Jalsa (2008) - "Jalsa"
 Arya 2 (2009)
 Adhurs (2010)
 Don Seenu (2010)
 Mr. Perfect (2011)
 Ragada (2010) 
 Gabbar Singh (2012) - "Dekho Dekho Gabbar"
 Shadow (2013)
 Om 3D (2013)
 Action 3D (2013)
 Adda (2013)
 Sankarabharanam (2015)
 Pelli SandaD (2021)

Hindi 
13B (2009)
Miss 420 (1998)
Hum Hain Bemisaal (1994)

Kannada  
Gajakesari (2014)

Tamil

Bengali

Television/Web series

References

External links
  
 

1965 births
Living people
Bollywood playback singers
21st-century Indian male actors
Indian male playback singers
Indian male voice actors
Indian rappers
Tamil playback singers
Telugu playback singers
Telugu film score composers
Male actors from Lucknow
Singers from Lucknow
Bigg Boss (Telugu TV series) contestants
Male film score composers